Ocenebra leukos is a species of sea snail, a marine gastropod mollusk in the family Muricidae, the murex snails or rock snails.

Distribution
This marine species occurs off the Canary Islands.

References

External links
 MNHN, Paris: holotype
 Houart, R. (2000). New species of Muricidae (Gastropoda) from the northeastern Atlantic and the Mediterranean sea. Zoosystema. 22 (3): 459-469
 Barco, A.; Herbert, G.; Houart, R.; Fassio, G. & Oliverio, M. (2017). A molecular phylogenetic framework for the subfamily Ocenebrinae (Gastropoda, Muricidae). Zoologica Scripta. 46 (3): 322-335

Ocenebra
Gastropods described in 2000